This is a list of schools in the City of Wakefield in the English county of West Yorkshire.

State-funded schools

Primary schools

Ackton Pastures Primary Academy, Whitwood
Ackworth Howard CE Junior and Infant School, Low Ackworth
Ackworth Mill Dam School, Ackworth
Airedale Infant School, Airedale
Airedale Junior School, Airedale
Alverthorpe St Paul's CE School, Alverthorpe
Ash Grove Primary Academy, South Elmsall
Badsworth CE Junior and Infant School, Badsworth
Carleton Park Junior and Infant School, Carleton
Carlton Junior and Infant School, South Elmsall
Castleford Park Junior Academy, Castleford
Castleford Three Lane Ends Academy, Castleford
Castleford Townville Infants' School, Castleford
Castleford Wheldon Infant School, Castleford
Cherry Tree Academy, Pontefract
Crigglestone St James CE Primary Academy, Crigglestone
Crofton Infant School, Crofton
Crofton Junior School, Crofton
Dane Royd Junior and Infant School, Hall Green
De Lacy Primary School, Pontefract
Dimple Well Infant School, Ossett
England Lane Academy, Knottingley
English Martyrs RC Primary School, Lupset
Fairburn View Primary School, Airedale
Featherstone All Saints CE Academy, Featherstone
Fitzwilliam Primary School, Fitzwilliam
Flanshaw Junior and Infant School, Flanshaw
Flushdyke Junior and Infant School, Flushdyke
Gawthorpe Community Academy, Gawthorpe
Girnhill Infant School, Featherstone
Glasshoughton Infant Academy, Castleford
Grove Lea Primary School, Hemsworth
Half Acres Primary Academy, Castleford
Halfpenny Lane Junior and Infant School, Pontefract
Hendal Primary School, Kettlethorpe
Holy Family and St Michael's RC Primary School, Pontefract
Horbury Bridge CE Junior and Infant Academy, Horbury
Horbury Primary Academy, Horbury
Jerry Clay Academy, Wrenthorpe
King's Meadow Academy, Fitzwilliam
Larks Hill Junior and Infant School, Pontefract
Lawefield Primary School, Thornes     
Lee Brig Infant School, Altofts
Mackie Hill Junior and Infant School, Crigglestone
Martin Frobisher Infant School, Altofts
Methodist Junior and Infants School, Thornes
Middlestown Primary Academy, Middlestown
Moorthorpe Primary School, Moorthorpe
The Mount Junior and Infant School, Thornes
Newlands Primary School, Normanton
Newton Hill Community School, Newton Hill
Normanton All Saints CE Infant School, Normanton
Normanton Altofts Junior School, Altofts
Normanton Common Primary Academy, Normanton
Normanton Junior Academy, Normanton
North Featherstone Junior and Infant School, Featherstone
Northfield Primary School, South Kirkby
Orchard Head Junior and Infant School, Pontefract
Ossett Holy Trinity CE Primary School, Ossett
Ossett South Parade Primary, Ossett
Outwood Primary Academy Bell Lane, Ackworth
Outwood Primary Academy Greenhill, East Moor
Outwood Primary Academy Kirkhamgate, Kirkhamgate
Outwood Primary Academy Ledger Lane, Outwood
Outwood Primary Academy Lofthouse Gate, Lofthouse Gate
Outwood Primary Academy Newstead Green, Havercroft
Outwood Primary Academy Park Hill, East Moor
Oyster Park Primary Academy, Ferry Fryston
Pinders Primary School, East Moor
Purston Infant School, Featherstone
The Rookeries Carleton Junior and Infant School, Carleton
Rooks Nest Academy, Outwood
Ryhill Junior and Infant School, Ryhill
Sacred Heart RC Primary School, Hemsworth
St Austin's RC Primary School, East Moor
St Botolph's CE Academy, Knottingley
St Giles CE Academy, Pontefract
St Helen's CE Primary School, Hemsworth
St Ignatius RC Primary School, Ossett
St John the Baptist RC Primary School, Normanton
St Joseph's RC Primary School, Castleford
St Joseph's RC Primary School, Moorthorpe
St Joseph's RC Primary School, Pontefract
St Michael's CE Academy, Flanshaw
St Peter's and Clifton CE Primary School, Horbury
St Thomas' CE Junior School, Featherstone
Sandal Castle Community Primary School, Sandal Magna
Sandal Magna Junior and Infant School, Agbrigg
Sharlston Community School, Sharlston
Shay Lane Primary School, Crofton
Simpson's Lane Academy, Knottingley
Sitlington Netherton Junior and Infant School, Netherton
Smawthorne Henry Moore Primary School, Castleford
South Hiendley Primary School, South Hiendley
South Kirkby Academy, South Kirkby
South Kirkby Common Road Infant and Nursery School, South Kirkby
South Ossett Infant Academy, Ossett
Southdale CE Junior School, Ossett
Stanley Grove Primary School, Stanley
Stanley St Peter's CE Junior and Infant School, Stanley
Streethouse Primary School, Streethouse
Towngate Primary Academy, Ossett
Upton Primary School, Upton
The Vale Primary Academy, Knottingley
Wakefield St John's CE Junior and Infant School, Wakefield
Wakefield St Mary's CE Primary School, East Moor
Wakefield Snapethorpe Primary School, Lupset
Walton Primary Academy, Walton
West Bretton Junior and Infant School, West Bretton
West End Academy, Hemsworth 
Willow Green Academy, Ferrybridge
Wrenthorpe Academy, Wrenthorpe

Secondary schools

Airedale Academy, Airedale
Carleton High School, Carleton
Castleford Academy, Castleford
Crofton Academy, Crofton
De Lacy Academy, Knottingley
The Featherstone Academy, Featherstone
Horbury Academy, Horbury
Kettlethorpe High School, Kettlethorpe
The King's School, Pontefract
Minsthorpe Community College, South Elmsall
Ossett Academy, Ossett
Outwood Academy City Fields, East Moor
Outwood Academy Freeston, Normanton
Outwood Academy Hemsworth, Hemsworth
Outwood Grange Academy, Outwood
St Thomas à Becket Catholic Secondary School, Sandal Magna
St Wilfrid's Catholic High School, Featherstone
Trinity Academy Cathedral, Thornes

Special and alternative schools
Evolve Academy, Lupset
High Well School, Pontefract
Highfield School, Ossett
Kingsland Primary School, Stanley
Oakfield Park School, Ackworth
Pinderfields Hospital PRU, Wrenthorpe
The Springfield Centre, Crofton

Further education
CAPA College
New College, Pontefract
Wakefield College

Independent schools

Primary and preparatory schools
Wakefield Grammar Pre-Preparatory School, Wakefield

Senior and all-through schools
Ackworth School, Ackworth
Queen Elizabeth Grammar School, Wakefield
Silcoates School, Wrenthorpe
Wakefield Girls' High School, Wakefield
Wakefield Independent School, Nostell

Special and alternative schools

Compass Community School Hemsworth, Hemsworth
Denby Grange School, Netherton
The Grange School, Ossett
Hall Cliffe Primary School, Wrenthorpe
Hall Cliffe School, Horbury
Ivy Lane School, East Moor
Meadowcroft School, East Moor
TLG Wakefield, Normanton

 
Wakefield
Schools